Yamaçoba is a village in the Şehitkamil District, Gaziantep Province, Turkey. The village is inhabited by Turkmens of the Jerid and Qiziq tribes and had a population of 1029 in 2021.

References

Villages in Şehitkamil District